Basil William Iwanyk (born January 4, 1970) is an American film producer. He is the founder of Thunder Road Films and most known for Sicario, The Town, Greenland and the John Wick franchise. His films have earned more than $2 billion internationally as of 2018. He is of Ukrainian descent.

Filmography

Film

Other credits

Television
Executive producer
 King of Late Night (2012)
 The Messengers (2015)
 The Fugitive (2020)
 The Continental (TBA)

Further reading

References

External links
 

1970 births
21st-century American businesspeople
American film producers
Film producers from New Jersey
People from Spring Lake, New Jersey
Living people
American people of Ukrainian descent
American mass media company founders
Villanova University alumni
Thunder Road Films